Bangladesh Railway Class 2700 diesel electric locomotive is currently (as of 2017) in service on the meter gauge of Bangladesh Railway. This dual cab locomotive series has been in service since 1994. Bangladesh Railway has a total 21 locomotives that are used in passenger services.

Builders details
The Class 2700 locomotives are built by ABB Henschel and Adtranz of Germany under License of Electro Motive Division. These 21 locomotives came to Bangladesh in 2 phases. They are-
 Year 1994 = 2701-2709 
 Year 1996 = 2710-2721

Technical details
The Class 2700 is a 1500 hp locomotive. The Electro Motive Division export model of this locomotive is GT18L-2. The wheel arrangement of this locomotive is A1A-A1A. The Class 2700 locomotives have a similar specification to the Bangladesh Railway 2600 and 2900 class locomotives.

The Bangladesh Railway classification of this locomotive is 'M.E.L -15'. Here - M stands for meter gauge, E Stands for diesel electric, L stands for Henschel and 15 stands for locomotive horsepower (x100).

Use

The Class 2700 locomotive can be used both for passenger services and freight services. It was highly recommended for prominent Bangladeshi trains like Subarna Express, Sonarbangla Express, Parabat Express etc. However, Class 2900 is preferred by Bangladesh Railway for pulling prominent trains nowadays. Class 2700 pulls commuters and short-distance intercity trains.

Initially, Class 2700 locomotives were used for freight services as well. Due to several mechanical constraints, they were taken off from the freight service.

Maintenance
Class 2700 Locomotives are maintained in the following workshops:

Central Locomotive Workshop (CLW) at Parbatipur, Dinajpur.
Diesel Workshop at Pahartali, Chittagong.

References

Locomotives of Bangladesh
Railway locomotives introduced in 1994
A1A-A1A locomotives
Metre gauge diesel locomotives